

The Curtiss Model 55 Kingbird was an airliner built in small numbers in the United States in the early 1930s. It was a twin-engine aircraft with a fuselage derived from the single-engine Curtiss Thrush. The Kingbird had two engine nacelles mounted on the struts on either side of the fuselage that braced the wing and the outrigger undercarriage. A distinctive design feature was the aircraft's blunt nose, located behind the propeller arcs. This allowed the engines to be mounted closer to each other and to the aircraft's centerline, therefore minimising asymmetrical thrust in case of an engine failure. For the same reason, the Thrush's single tailfin was replaced by twin tails on the Kingbird, and the main production model, the D-2 fitted a second horizontal stabilizer and elevator between these fins.

Eastern Air Transport was to be the Kingbird's main operator, flying 14 of them for a few years. The United States Marine Corps also purchased an example, first designating it JC-1, then RC-1 and using it as an air ambulance.

Variants
 Kingbird C Prototype powered by 185 hp (138 kW) six-cylinder Curtiss R-600 Challenger engines. One built, but found to be underpowered. Later converted to Kingbird J-1.
 Kingbird D-1 Second and third prototypes (previously Kingbird J-3 and J-2) powered by 225 hp nine-cylinder Wright Whirlwind J-6-7 radial engines. Later converted to D-2 standard.
 Kingbird D-2 Production aircraft with two 300 hp (224 kW) Whirlwind J-6-9 engines. 14 built plus two converted from D-1s.
 Kingbird D-3 One-off Curtiss executive transport. Two 330 hp (246 kW) Whirlwind J-6-9 engines. Seats for five passengers.
 Kingbird J-1 First prototype after re-engining with Whirlwind engines. 
 Kingbird J-2 Third prototype, J-6-7 engines.
 Kingbird J-3 Second prototype, J-6-9 engines.
 RC-1 Single Kingbird D-2 for US Navy, originally ordered as JC-1 (J for utility), but delivered as RC-1 (R for transport).

Operators

 Eastern Air Transport
 United States Marine Corps

 Turkish Airlines (under former official name: State Airlines Administration)

Specifications (D-2)

See also

References

Notes

Bibliography

External links

  A contemporary technical article on the Kingbird, with details of the version with 225 hp Whirlwind J-6-7 engines.
 aerofiles.com
 generalaviationnews.com

Kingbird
1920s United States airliners
High-wing aircraft
Aircraft first flown in 1929
Twin piston-engined tractor aircraft